Kočuli is a village in the municipality of Valandovo, North Macedonia. It is located near the Greek border.

Demographics
According to the 2002 census, the village had a total of 50 inhabitants. Ethnic groups in the village include:

Turks 49
Others 1

References

External links

Villages in Valandovo Municipality
Turkish communities in North Macedonia